Kvitøya (English: "White Island") is an island in the Svalbard archipelago in the Arctic Ocean, with an area of . It is the easternmost part of the Kingdom of Norway. The closest Russian Arctic possession, Victoria Island, lies only  to the east of Kvitøya.

The few ice-free land areas are each only a few square kilometres large and very barren and rocky, the largest being Andréeneset on the southwest corner of the island. Kvitøya is a part of the Nordaust-Svalbard Nature Reserve.

Etymology
The present name was given by whaler Johan Kjeldsen of Tromsø in 1876. The original spelling of the name from 1876 was Hvidøen (Danish–Norwegian). In 1927, it was changed to Kvitøya. Like other names in the Norwegian Arctic and Antarctic islands and areas the Nynorsk form of Norwegian is used in the name – the Bokmål form would have been Hvitøyen or Hvitøya.

History
Kvitøya was discovered by the Dutchman Cornelis Giles in 1707, and it was seen under the name 'Giles Land' or 'Gillis Land' on maps in different shapes, sizes and positions throughout the centuries.

Andrée's Arctic balloon expedition

The island was the resting place of the Andrée's Arctic balloon expedition of 1897, organised by S. A. Andrée. They reached the island on foot by October 6 and settled on the only ice free part on the island, on what is now called Andréeneset.

The fate of the expedition for many years was one of the great mysteries of the Arctic, until its remains were discovered by the ship Bratvaag in 1930, over thirty years later, and diaries, logs of scientific observations and photographs—glass negative plates, which had been deep frozen and could be developed—were recovered at the site. Modern researchers hold that the three members of the expedition died within two weeks of reaching the island.

A monument commemorating the three men, S. A. Andrée, Nils Strindberg and Knut Frænkel is erected on the island. Another monument, put there by the "Stockholm expedition" in 1997 to commemorate the 100 years anniversary of the tragic event, was later deliberately destroyed by the Svalbard authority, on the ground of it being illegally erected.

Climate

See also 
 List of islands in the Arctic Ocean
 List of islands of Norway
 Queen Victoria Sea

References

 
Islands of Svalbard
Uninhabited islands of Norway